Coxhoe railway station served the village of Coxhoe, County Durham, England from 1838 to 1902 on the Coxhoe branch of the Clarence Railway.

History 
The station opened on 20 June 1838 by the Clarence Railway. The station was situated west of the level crossing near Station Road between Grange Farm and Low House Farm. There were two trains to Stockton via Ferryhill and Sedgefield that departed at 8:40am and 4:40pm. In the opposite direction trains arrived from Stockton at 8:30am and 4:35pm. The station was one of two to have served Coxhoe, the other being  on the Great North of England, Clarence & Hartlepool Junction Railway, though the former CR station was located far closer to the town centre than that of the GNEC&HJR. The station closed to passengers on 1 April 1902 but the station remained open to goods traffic until 3 October 1966 when it ceased.

References

External links 

Disused railway stations in County Durham
Former North Eastern Railway (UK) stations
Railway stations in Great Britain opened in 1838
Railway stations in Great Britain closed in 1902
1838 establishments in England
1902 disestablishments in England
Coxhoe